The Magical Sounds of Banco de Gaia is an album by Banco de Gaia. It was released in 1999 on Six Degrees Records as part of their Travel Series.

Track listing

References

External links
CMJ New Music Report, February 22, 1999

1999 albums
Banco de Gaia albums
Six Degrees Records albums